Nyskie Lake ( or Jezioro Głębinowskie) is a reservoir constructed on the Nysa Kłodzka river in Poland in 1971. Its name comes from the nearby town of Nysa. The dam that was used to create the reservoir is 2 kilometers long, and 20 meters high. The total area of the lake is 2000 hectares, with 124 million cubic meters of water. Before creation of the reservoir, several villages had been resettled. By the lake, a hydroelectric power plant is located.

Together with adjacent Otmuchów Lake, both reservoirs make the Otmuchow-Nysa Area of Protected Landscape (Polish: Otmuchowsko-Nyski Obszar Krajobrazu Chronionego), with several species of birds living in the region. The reservoir is located near the main national road number 46, which goes from Gliwice to Kłodzko.

Lakes of Poland
LNyskie
Reservoirs in Poland
1971 establishments in Poland
Nysa County
Lakes of Silesian Voivodeship